This was the first edition of the tournament.

Nuno Borges and Francisco Cabral won the title after defeating Maximilian Neuchrist and Michail Pervolarakis 7–5, 6–7(5–7), [10–8] in the final.

Seeds

Draw

References

External links
 Main draw

Bahrain Ministry of Interior Tennis Challenger - Doubles